The Kalahari Deposits is an Early Cretaceous (Aptian) geologic formation in South Africa. Dinosaur remains diagnostic to the genus level are among the fossils that have been recovered from the formation. The depositional environment is described as a crater lake where poorly lithified, concretionary conglomerate and volcaniclastic, intraclastic, calcareous mudstone were deposited under quiet subaqueous conditions, probably a "crater-fill succession above an olivine-melilitie intrusion".

Paleofauna 
 Kangnasaurus coetzeei - "Tooth, postcranial elements including a femur."

See also 
 List of dinosaur-bearing rock formations
 List of stratigraphic units with few dinosaur genera

References

Bibliography 
  

Geologic formations of South Africa
Upper Cretaceous Series of Africa
Cretaceous South Africa
Conglomerate formations
Mudstone formations
Lacustrine deposits
Paleontology in South Africa
Geography of the Western Cape